Major General Owen Forbes Phillips,  (9 June 1882 – 15 May 1966) was a senior officer in the Australian Army who spent much of his career in artillery and ordnance.

References

1882 births
1966 deaths
Australian Companions of the Distinguished Service Order
Australian Companions of the Order of St Michael and St George
Australian generals
Australian military personnel of World War I
Australian Army personnel of World War II
Knights of the Order of Saints Maurice and Lazarus
Military personnel from Queensland
People from Warwick, Queensland
Recipients of the Distinguished Service Medal (US Army)